Safari is an EP by the Breeders, released in 1992 on 4AD/Elektra Records.  By the time of its release, Kim Deal had enlisted her twin sister Kelley to play guitar for the band. It is the only Breeders recording that features both Kelley Deal and Tanya Donelly.

Track listing

Personnel
The Breeders
Kim Deal – vocals, guitar
Kelley Deal – guitar
Tanya Donelly – vocals, guitar
Josephine Wiggs – vocals, bass, cello
Britt Walford (billed as Mike Hunt) – Drums
Jon Mattock – drums on "Safari"
Technical
Paul Berry, Dante DeSole, Guy Fixsen, Mark Freegard and Ben Darlow – engineers
Vaughan Oliver – sleeve
Shinro Ohtake - charcoal drawing "Nairobi Viii" (1983)

References 

The Breeders albums
1992 debut EPs
4AD EPs
Elektra Records EPs